The Arizona Interscholastic Association (AIA) is one of two regulatory bodies for high school athletics and activities in the state of Arizona. It comprises all of the state's public district high schools (except Ajo High School, Beaver Dam High School and Gila Bend High School), various charter and private schools, plus a full member in Winterhaven, California and an associate member in Nogales, Sonora, Mexico. The AIA has 264 members, including 262 full members (Rincon/University are one team and Bowie/San Simon are one team) and 2 associate members. Its associate members are BASIS Chandler and Colegio Gante.

The AIA is not the only high school sports regulatory body in Arizona (the Canyon Athletic Association coordinates events for smaller schools, especially charter schools), but it is the largest.

See also
 NFHS

References

External links
 Official site

High school sports in Arizona
Sports organizations established in 1925
Organizations based in Arizona
High school sports associations in the United States